Elivelton José da Silva (born 21 January 1992), known as just Elivélton, is a Brazilian footballer who plays as a midfielder.

Honours

Club
Santos
Campeonato Paulista: 2011

References

External links

1992 births
Living people
Brazilian footballers
Brazil youth international footballers
Santos FC players
Oeste Futebol Clube players
Association football midfielders
Footballers from São Paulo